Antiponemertes allisonae is a species of nemertean worm that is endemic to Banks Peninsula on New Zealand's South Island. It can be found in open bush under logs. It has not been recorded since 1961, and it has been suggested that this species may be extinct. If it is still extant, its habitat has been heavily altered by deforestation and grazing by introduced deer. This species may become transferred to the family Plectonemertidae as more taxonomic information becomes available.

References

Prosorhochmidae
Endemic fauna of New Zealand
Endangered animals
Animals described in 1973
Worms of New Zealand
Endemic worms of New Zealand